Isaac Shamujompa (born 12 October 1994) is a Zambian footballer who plays as a defender for Zanaco and the Zambia national football team.

Career

Zanaco
In August 2021, Shamujompa joined Zambia Super League club Zanaco, signing a three-year contract.

References

External links

1994 births
Living people
Zambian footballers
Zambia international footballers
Association football defenders
Buildcon F.C. players
Zanaco F.C. players
Zambia A' international footballers
2018 African Nations Championship players
Nkana F.C. players
Nchanga Rangers F.C. players